Seedlip is a British company that makes plant-based liquor substitutes for use in non-alcoholic mixed drinks.

Seedlip describes its products as "the world's first distilled non-alcoholic spirits". They are sold in three varieties: "Garden 108" (peas and garden herbs), "Spice 94" (spices, citrus peels and barks) and "Grove 42" (citrus and spices). According to their labels, Seedlip products consist of water, "natural botanical distillates and extracts (15%)", the preservative potassium sorbate, and citric acid. On their own, their taste has been described as "a sort of pleasantly pungent savoury-herby-medicinal water". Claire Lower of Lifehacker was critical of the product, writing that it added little to mocktails and that its usefulness depended heavily on the mixologist's skills and on the other ingredients.

Seedlip is one of the best-known but also most expensive brands in what is, as of 2020, the rapidly growing field of liquor substitutes. Founded in 2014 by Ben Branson, a former luxury brand designer, the company has been majority-owned by the multinational alcohol company Diageo since 2019. The name derives from the seedlep or seedlip, a basket for carrying seeds while sowing.

References

External links 

 Seedlip website

Diageo brands
2014 establishments
Drink companies of the United Kingdom
Non-alcoholic mixed drinks